Yury Lukyanchuk (born 5 January 1990) is a Belarusian handball player for Riihimäki Cocks and the Belarusian national team.

He represented Belarus at the 2020 European Men's Handball Championship.

References

External links

1990 births
Living people
Belarusian male handball players
Sportspeople from Brest, Belarus
Expatriate handball players
Belarusian expatriate sportspeople in Finland